The IMPLY gate is a digital logic gate that implements a logical conditional.

Symbols
There are two symbols for IMPLY gates: the traditional symbol and the IEEE symbol. For more information see Logic gate symbols.

The logic symbol → can be used to denote IMPLY in algebraic expressions.

See also

NIMPLY gate
AND gate
NOT gate
NAND gate
NOR gate
XOR gate
XNOR gate
Boolean algebra (logic)
Logic gates

Logic gates